The Amazon was a cyclecar produced by Amazon Cars Ltd in Billiter Street, London, EC3, England from 1921 to 1922.

It featured a rear-mounted air-cooled twin 6/9 hp Coventry Victor engine with chain drive to the rear wheels through a three-speed-and-reverse gearbox made by Juckes. To give a conventional appearance the 2-seater car had a dummy radiator at the front.

It cost £235.

See also
 List of car manufacturers of the United Kingdom

References
Georgano, G.N., "Amazon", in G.N. Georgano, ed., The Complete Encyclopedia of Motorcars 1885-1968  (New York: E.P. Dutton and Co., 1974), pp. 40.

Vintage vehicles
Cyclecars
Defunct motor vehicle manufacturers of England
Vehicle manufacture in London